Cara O'Sullivan (1962 – 26 January 2021) was an Irish coloratura soprano singer.

Background
O'Sullivan grew up in The Lough, Cork. Both of her parents and her grandparents on both sides were singers, though not professionally. She is survived by 3 siblings, including sisters Aoife and Nuala. Nuala represented Cork at the Rose of Tralee in the 1980s. O'Sullivan had one daughter, Christine, an accountant. O'Sullivan lived in Frankfield, Cork. She was nicknamed "Caradiva" by her friends.

Career
O'Sullivan's family noted that her voice began to develop at the age of 12. She attended the Cork School of Music, where O'Sullivan stated that at 17 the head of the school, Jack Murphy, told her parents: "She can go anywhere in the world, she can be anything she wants to be, she can go to the very top."

In her 20s, O'Sullivan took a break from singing for 4 years, returning to music after the birth of her daughter.

O'Sullivan achieved her first major role in 1996 at the age of 34, as Donna Anna in Don Giovanni with Welsh National Opera. The world renowned Australian soprano Dame Joan Sutherland helped O'Sullivan to prepare for the role. In 1997 and 1998, O'Sullivan starred as the Queen of the Night in the Opera North performances of The Magic Flute. The Daily Telegraph praised her "spirit and diamantine accuracy". She appeared on the 2008 anti-domestic violence charity album Sanctuary.

She also performed Così fan tutte, La traviata, Handel's Messiah, and Faust.

O'Sullivan's performances included:
 East Cork Choral Society
 English National Opera
 Everyman Palace Theatre
 Feis Maitiú Corcaigh
 Gaiety Theatre, Dublin
 Hibernian Orchestra
 National Concert Hall
 Opera Nantes
 Palau de la Música Catalana
 Paris Opera
 RTÉ Concert Orchestra
 St Patrick's Cathedral, Dublin
 Sydney Opera House
 Vlaamse Opera

In 2019, O'Sullivan received the inaugural Cork Culture Award by Lord Mayor of Cork, Mick Finn.

Voice
O'Sullivan was a dramatic coloratura soprano. She has been described as a "fearsome coloratura" with "spitfire-like delivery".

Health
Shortly before O'Sullivan was to begin rehearsals in Wales, she was diagnosed with cancer.  The stage 2 leg tumour was discovered by her beautician during a waxing session.  O'Sullivan had previously dismissed the lump as cellulite.  The diagnosis did not affect her performances, as she received initial radiotherapy treatment in Ireland and then in Wales, continuing to work throughout, performing 20 times in 14 weeks. She suffered from insomnia.

O'Sullivan had nodules removed from her vocal cords at the private Blackheath Hospital, London. After the operation, she recuperated at Glenstal Abbey, where she was completely silent for one week.

In 2018, O'Sullivan was diagnosed with early-onset dementia which led to her retirement from professional singing. Celebratory concerts were organised in her honour in Cork and Dublin.

On 26 January 2021, it was announced that Cara O'Sullivan had died. Her death was marked by an outpouring of tributes to her talent and her outstanding contribution to music in Ireland and internationally, with The Irish Independent stating that "[Ms O'Sullivan] was famed for her support of charitable events - and her sense of humour."

References

External links
 

1962 births
2021 deaths
Musicians from Cork (city)
Irish operatic sopranos
20th-century Irish women opera singers
21st-century Irish women opera singers
Alumni of Cork Institute of Technology